Chuvisco Falls is a waterfall in Brazil, located in the Fish River, bordering the municipalities of Santo Antônio do Rio Abaixo and São Sebastião do Rio Preto, in Minas Gerais. It has a very large pool with an average temperature.

Waterfalls of Brazil
Landforms of Minas Gerais